Kardámaina or Kardámena, is a small Greek town 7 km from Kos Island International Airport at Antimacheia, situated mid-way along the south coast of the island of Kos. It lies in the municipal unit of Irakleides, in the Dodecanese. Once a small fishing village, it has been a popular summer destination for the past two decades, offering pubs, restaurants, bars, night clubs and watersports facilities. According to the 2011 census, there were 1,650 inhabitants census and a land area of 35.150 km². Between June and September the town population triples due to the influx of tourists.

History
Kardamaina is built on the site of the ancient settlement of Alasarna. During the 2nd century BC, Alasarna was an important urban center with a thousand citizens (excluding slaves).

Archaeological excavations have brought to light some impressive ruins, such as a temple of Apollo, an extensive Early Christian settlement (one of the few known in Greece), and four basilicas that belong to the same period. Stone objects of everyday use (millstones, tools, vases, vessels), mostly made of volcanic and sedimentary rocks, have been recovered.

Gallery

Kos
Populated places in Kos (regional unit)